Diocese of San Carlos may refer to one of the following Roman Catholic dioceses:

 Diocese of San Carlos (Philippines)
 Diocese of San Carlos de Ancud, in Chile
 Diocese of San Carlos de Bariloche, in Argentina
 Diocese of San Carlos de Venezuela